Samuel ibn Naghrillah (Sh'muel HaLevi ben Yosef HaNagid;  ʾAbū ʾIsḥāq ʾIsmāʿīl bin an-Naghrīlah), also known as Samuel HaNagid (Shmuel HaNagid, lit. Samuel the Prince) and Isma’il ibn Naghrilla (born 993; died 1056), was a medieval Jewish Spanish Talmudic scholar, grammarian, philologist, soldier, merchant, politician, and an influential poet who lived in Iberia at the time of the Moorish rule. His poetry was one area through which he was well known. He was perhaps the most politically influential Jew in Muslim Spain. He was also the Prime Minister of the Muslim state of Granada and battlefield commander of the non-Jewish Granadan army.

Life
Samuel ibn Naghrillah was an Andalusian Jew born in Mérida to a wealthy family in 993. He studied Jewish law and became a Talmudic scholar who was fluent in Hebrew, Arabic, Latin, and one of the Berber languages.

He was the student of Rabbi Hanok, who was the head of the Rabbinical community during the al-Andalus caliphate. He was twenty years old when the caliphate fell. He then moved to Malaga and became either a spice merchant or grocer. Around 1020 he moved to Granada where he was hired as the secretary to ‘Abu ‘l-’Abbas ibn al-’Arif, who was the chief secretary to the King of Granada. His relations with the Granada royal court, and his eventual promotion to the position of vizier, happened in a coincidental manner of which 20th century scholar Jacob Rader Marcus gives an interesting account pulled from a 12th century book Sefer Seder ha-kabbalah. The shop Samuel set up was near the palace of the vizier of Granada, Abu al-Kasim ibn al-Arif. The vizier met Samuel ibn Naghrillah when his maid servant began to ask Naghrillah to write letters for her.  Eventually Naghrillah was given the jobs of a tax collector, and then a secretary, and finally an assistant vizier of state to the Berber king Habbus al-Muzaffar.

When Habbus died in 1038, Samuel ibn Naghrillah made certain that King Habbus’ second son Badis ibn Habus succeeded him, not his first born son Bulukkin. The reason behind this act was that Badis was more favored by the people, compared to Bulukkin, with the general Jewish population under Samuel ibn Naghrillah supporting Badis. In return for his support, Badis made Samuel ibn Naghrillah his vizier and top general. Some sources say that he held office as a viziership of state for over three decades until his death sometime around or after 1056. Because Jews were not permitted to hold public office in Islamic nations as an agreement made in the Pact of Umar, that Samuel ibn Naghrillah, a Jew or dhimmi, should hold such a high public office was rare. His example was used to support the Golden Age theory, regarding Jewish life under Muslim rule, rather than the lachrymose view. His unique position as the viziership made him the highest ranking Jewish courtier in all of Spain. Recognizing this, in the year of 1027, he took on the title of nagid, or Prince. The peculiar fact regarding his position as the top general in the Granada army was that he was a Jew. That a Jew would command the Muslim army, which he did for 17 years, having them under his authority, was an astonishing feat. Other leading Jews, including Joseph ibn Migash, in the generation that succeeded Samuel ha-Nagid, lent their support to Bulukkin and were forced to flee for their safety.

One story that encapsulates Samuel ibn Naghrillah’s political prowess takes place soon after the succession of Badis. Yidder’s (Habbus’ favorite nephew) faction told Samuel ibn Naghrillah that they wanted to overthrow the new king and wanted his support. Samuel ibn Naghrillah faked support and allowed them to hold a meeting in his house. He told Badis and allowed him to spy on the meeting. Badis wanted to execute the traders but Samuel ibn Naghrillah convinced him that it would be politically better not to. In the end he was even further respected by the king but also in good standing with the rebels.

As a Jew, Samuel ha-Nagid actively sought to assert an independence from the Babylonian geonim by writing independently on Jewish law for the Spanish community.  The Nagid became the leader of Spanish Jewry around the late 1020s. He promoted the welfare of the Jewish people through various acts. For example, he promoted Jewish learning by purchasing many copies of the Talmud, the massive compendium of commentaries on the Jewish oral law.  He also promoted the study of the Talmud by giving a form of scholarship to those who wanted to study the Torah for a living.  He died in 1056 of natural causes.

It has often been speculated that Samuel was the father or otherwise an ancestor of Qasmūna, the only attested female Arabic-language medieval Jewish poet, but the foundations for these claims are shaky.

Kfar HaNagid, a moshav in modern Israel, was named after him.

Joseph ibn Naghrela
In 1049, Samuel ibn Naghrillah arranged a marriage for his son Joseph ibn Naghrela (Yusef ibn Naghrillah) (1035–1066) to the only daughter of the most respected Torah sage of the generation, Rav Nissim Gaon of Kairouan. Joseph succeeded his father as vizier of Granada before turning twenty-one.  Many Muslims, envious of his position and unhappy with Joseph's excesses, accused him of using his office to benefit Jewish friends. Joseph was assassinated in a mob uprising against him on December 30, 1066. The people then proceeded to crucify his body upon the city's main gate. The following morning, the massacre of Granada's Jews began and a mob went on a rampage in Granada, killing a large number of Jewish inhabitants. The Jewish community was later re-established but was destroyed again in 1090 by the Almoravids.

Works

Poetry
Samuel Nagid was a famous Hebrew poet of the Middle Ages, as well a patron of many other poets, and was well known for his homoerotic poetry.
Eban says that the Nagid's influence was in that he established a new style of Hebrew poetry by applying aspects of Arabic poetry to biblical Hebrew. This unique application made Hebrew poetry access the major genres of Arabic poetry. He also wrote poetry in the battlefield. When he defeated the allied armies of Seville, Malaga and the Berbers on Sept. 8, 1047 at Ronda, he wrote in his Hebrew poem of gratitude for his deliverance: "A redemption which was like the mother of my other redemptions and they became to it as daughters."His main poetic works include "Ben Tehillim" (Son of Psalms), "Ben Qoheleth" (Son of Ecclesiastes), and "Ben Mishlei" (Son of Proverbs), each of which imitates the "father work". He founded the yeshiva that produced such brilliant scholars as  Yitzhaq ibn Ghiath and  Maimon ben Joseph, the father of Maimonides. Many of Naghrillah’s poems were also written as warnings or as an interpretation of religious rules. His poem The Reward shows his belief that one should set time for God and time for himself. His poem The Prison talks about how the world is a cage for all of man. He claims that one should live their life unrestrained. His poem The Two Cries talks about the beginning and end of life. He talks about how people are born crying, and when people die, others cry for them. His poem Leave The Hidden Things talks about leaving the mysteries of the world for God to know.

Other works
 Samuel is generally credited as the author of Mevo ha-Talmud (Introduction to the Talmud), a manual for Talmud study that was reprinted in many later editions of the Talmud.
 An Arabic treatise on biblical Hebrew grammar.
 "Ben Tehillim" (Son of Psalms),
 "Ben Qoheleth" (Son of Ecclesiastes), and
 "Ben Mishlei" (Son of Proverbs).

Editions and translations
 Diwan of Shemuel Hannaghid, ed. by David Solomon Sassoon (London: Oxford University Press, 1934)
 Diwan Shemu'el ha-Nagid, ed. by D. Yarden, 2 vols (Jerusalem, 1966–82)
 Selected Poems of Shmuel HaNagid, trans. by Peter Cole (Princeton, NJ: Princeton University Press, 1996)

References

External links
 Video lecture on Shmuel ha-Nagid by Dr. Henry Abramson
 For more information, see "Poets and Warriors," Jewish Ideas Daily, by Aryeh Tepper

993 births
Year of death uncertain
11th-century Spanish poets
11th-century businesspeople
11th-century Jews from al-Andalus
Grammarians of Hebrew
Hebrew-language poets
Jewish viziers
People from Mérida, Spain
Poets from al-Andalus
Spanish male poets
Spanish merchants
Spanish soldiers
Spanish philologists
Talmudists
Taifa of Granada